Burundian elections of 2010 may refer to:
 Burundian presidential election, 2010
 Burundian legislative election, 2010